In enzymology, a vitamin-K-epoxide reductase (warfarin-insensitive) is an enzyme that catalyzes the chemical reaction

3-hydroxy-2-methyl-3-phytyl-2,3-dihydronaphthoquinone + oxidized dithiothreitol  2,3-epoxy-2,3-dihydro-2-methyl-3-phytyl-1,4-naphthoquinone + 1,4-dithiothreitol

Thus, the two substrates of this enzyme are 3-hydroxy-2-methyl-3-phytyl-2,3-dihydronaphthoquinone and oxidized dithiothreitol, whereas its two products are 2,3-epoxy-2,3-dihydro-2-methyl-3-phytyl-1,4-naphthoquinone and 1,4-dithiothreitol.

This enzyme belongs to the family of oxidoreductases, specifically those acting on the CH or CH2 groups of donor with a disulfide as acceptor. The systematic name of this enzyme class is 3-hydroxy-2-methyl-3-phytyl-2,3-dihydronaphthoquinone:oxidized-dithi othreitol oxidoreductase.

References

 

EC 1.17.4
Enzymes of unknown structure